East African may refer to:
Any person or object of, or pertaining to, East Africa
East African Safari Air, an airline based in Kenya, now trading as Fly-SAX
The EastAfrican, a weekly newspaper in East Africa